Downsville is the name of several communities in the United States, including:

Downsville, Louisiana, a community in Union and Lincoln parishes
Downsville, Maryland, a community in Washington County
Downsville, New York, a community in the town of Colchester
Downsville, Texas, a community in McLennan County
Downsville, Wisconsin, a community in Dunn County